The Julia A. Purnell Museum is located at 208 West Market Street, Snow Hill, Maryland, United States.  The building that houses the museum was originally the St. Agnes Catholic Church built in 1891.  The museum exhibits 500 years of local history.

Notes

External links
Julia A. Purnell Museum (official website) 
Julia A. Purnell Museum (Ocean City Vacation and Hotels Guide website)

History museums in Maryland
Museums in Worcester County, Maryland
Museums established in 1957
Churches completed in 1891
1957 establishments in Maryland